The 1958 Masters Tournament was the 22nd Masters Tournament, held April 3–6 at Augusta National Golf Club in Augusta, Georgia. Arnold Palmer won the first of his four Masters titles, one stroke ahead of runners-up Doug Ford and Fred Hawkins. It was the first of his seven major titles.

Palmer, age 28, was the third round co-leader and eagled the 13th hole on Sunday to propel him to victory, as he three-putted on the final green. Three-time champion Sam Snead, age 45, was the other co-leader after 54 holes, but shot a 79 (+7) on Sunday to fall to 13th place. One stroke back entering the final round was 1955 champion Cary Middlecoff, who carded a 75 in the final round and tied for 6th.

Palmer's first Masters victory was not without some controversy. On the 12th hole of the final round, Palmer thought his tee ball was embedded behind the green but the on-site rules official would not give him relief. Playing that ball as it lay, Palmer made a double-bogey. Upset over the questionable ruling and the double-bogey, Palmer then played a second ball from behind the green and, after taking relief, made a par.  Several holes later word came from the tournament officials that Palmer was entitled to relief and his par score on 12 would stand.

Prior to the tournament, two stone arch bridges crossing Rae's Creek were dedicated, honoring two-time champions Ben Hogan and Byron Nelson. Hogan's is at the par-3 12th hole, and commemorated his record 72-hole score in 1953, his second win at Augusta and first of three consecutive majors that year. The other bridge departs the 13th tee; Nelson went birdie-eagle at these two holes in the final round in 1937, gained six strokes on the leader, and won the first of his five majors.

Sports Illustrated writer Herbert Warren Wind first used the term "Amen Corner" in a story to describe where the critical final day's action had occurred.

This was the first major to have a five-figure winner's share; six figures arrived at the 1983 PGA Championship and seven at the 2001 Masters.

Field
1. Masters champions
Jack Burke Jr. (4,8,11), Jimmy Demaret (8,9), Doug Ford (4,8,11), Claude Harmon (10), Ben Hogan (2,3,4), Herman Keiser, Cary Middlecoff (2,9), Byron Nelson (2,4,8), Henry Picard (4), Gene Sarazen (2,3,4), Horton Smith, Sam Snead (3,4,8,9), Craig Wood (2)
Ralph Guldahl (2) did not play.

The following categories only apply to Americans

2. U.S. Open champions
Julius Boros (9), Billy Burke, Jack Fleck, Ed Furgol (8,11), Tony Manero, Lloyd Mangrum, Dick Mayer (9,10,11), Fred McLeod, Sam Parks Jr., Lew Worsham

3. The Open champions
Jock Hutchison (4), Denny Shute (4)

4. PGA champions
Walter Burkemo (9,10), Vic Ghezzi, Chick Harbert (9), Chandler Harper, Lionel Hebert (10,11), Johnny Revolta, Paul Runyan, Jim Turnesa

5. U.S. Amateur and Amateur champions
Dick Chapman (7,a), Charles Coe (a), Hillman Robbins (7,a), Harvie Ward (8,a)

6. Members of the 1957 U.S. Walker Cup team
Rex Baxter (7,a), Arnold Blum (a), Joe Campbell (a), William C. Campbell (a), Bill Hyndman (9,a), Chuck Kocsis (a), Dale Morey (a), Billy Joe Patton (9,a), Mason Rudolph (7,a), Bud Taylor (7,8,a)

Morey was a reserve for the team.

7. 1957 U.S. Amateur quarter-finalists
Gene Andrews (a), Phil Rodgers (a)

Dick Yost did not play.

8. Top 24 players and ties from the 1957 Masters Tournament
Billy Casper, Mike Fetchick (9), Dow Finsterwald (9,10,11), Marty Furgol, Fred Hawkins (9,11), Jay Hebert (10), Al Mengert, Arnold Palmer, Henry Ransom, Ken Venturi (9)

Johnny Palmer's wife was having a baby and he did not play.

9. Top 16 players and ties from the 1957 U.S. Open
Billy Maxwell, Frank Stranahan

10. 1957 PGA Championship quarter-finalists
Charles Sheppard, Don Whitt

11. Members of the U.S. 1957 Ryder Cup team
Tommy Bolt, Ted Kroll, Art Wall Jr.

12. One player, either amateur or professional, not already qualified, selected by a ballot of ex-Masters champions
Mike Souchak

13. One professional, not already qualified, selected by a ballot of ex-U.S. Open champions
Gene Littler

14. One amateur, not already qualified, selected by a ballot of ex-U.S. Amateur champions
Don Cherry (a)

15. Two players, not already qualified, from a points list based on finishes in the winter part of the 1958 PGA Tour
Dave Ragan, Bo Wininger

16.  Winner of the 1957 Canadian Open
George Bayer

17. Foreign invitations
Al Balding (8), Bob Charles (a), Bruce Crampton (8), Henri de Lamaze (a), Roberto De Vicenzo (9), Stan Leonard (8), Torakichi Nakamura, Koichi Ono, Frank Phillips, Gary Player (8), Peter Thomson (3,8), Flory Van Donck, Norman Von Nida, Nick Weslock (a)

Numbers in brackets indicate categories that the player would have qualified under had they been American.

Round summaries

First round
Thursday, April 3, 1958

Source

Second round
Friday, April 4, 1958

Source

Third round
Saturday, April 5, 1958

Source

Final round
Sunday, April 6, 1958

Final leaderboard

Sources:

Scorecard

Cumulative tournament scores, relative to par
{|class="wikitable" span = 50 style="font-size:85%;
|-
|style="background: Red;" width=10|
|Eagle
|style="background: Pink;" width=10|
|Birdie
|style="background: PaleGreen;" width=10|
|Bogey
|style="background: Green;" width=10|
|Double bogey
|}

References

External links
Masters.com – past winners and results
Augusta.com – 1958 Masters leaderboard and scorecards

1958
1958 in golf
1958 in American sports
1958 in sports in Georgia (U.S. state)
April 1958 sports events in the United States